The Lena Cheeks is the name of a stretch of the Lena with peculiar rock formations in Kirensky District, Irkutsk Oblast, Russia.

This feature of the Lena basin is a tourist attraction regularly visited by river cruiser Mikhail Svetlov from Yakutsk.

Description
The Lena Cheeks area is a roughly  canyon bound by cliffs where there are three characteristic rock formations known as "Cheeks".

The rocks are called First, Second and Third cheek, the latter being the furthest downstream. The First and Third cheeks rise above the right bank, and the Second above the left bank.

Quotes
The Cheeks of the Lena were described by 19th century travelers:

See also
Lena Pillars
List of rock formations

References

External links 

Lena River. Osetrovo – Lena Cheeks

Lena River
Rock formations of Russia
Tourist attractions in Irkutsk Oblast
Canyons and gorges of Russia